Helena Szafran (1888-1969) was a Polish botanist, educator and conservationist known for her botanical research on the flora of Greater Poland.

References 

1888 births
1969 deaths
20th-century Polish women scientists
20th-century Polish botanists